Srivedya Gurazada (born 15 August 2002) is an American badminton player. She trains at the Chetan Anand Badminton Academy in Hyderabad. She formerly represented India and won her first BWF title in women's doubles at Mexico Open in 2021.

Achievements

BWF World Tour (1 runners-up) 
The BWF World Tour, which was announced on 19 March 2017 and implemented in 2018, is a series of elite badminton tournaments sanctioned by the Badminton World Federation (BWF). The BWF World Tour is divided into levels of World Tour Finals, Super 1000, Super 750, Super 500, Super 300 and the BWF Tour Super 100.

Mixed doubles

BWF International Challenge/Series (2 titles)
Women's doubles

  BWF International Challenge tournament
  BWF International Series tournament
  BWF Future Series tournament

References

External links
 

2002 births
Living people
Sportspeople from Boston
American female badminton players
Indian female badminton players
Racket sportspeople from Hyderabad, India
Sportswomen from Hyderabad, India
American emigrants to India
American expatriates in India
American people of Telugu descent
American sportspeople of Indian descent
21st-century American women